Gu An ((ca. 1289–after 1365), style name as Dingzhi, pseudonym as Yuna Jushi, was a famed Chinese painter in the Yuan Dynasty.

Gu An as born in Huaidong (淮東 - present day Kunshan in Jiangsu Province). He excelled in bamboo painting, particularly bamboo waving in the breeze.

Notes

References
 Ci hai bian ji wei yuan hui. Ci hai. Shanghai: Shanghai ci shu chu ban she, 1979.

1289 births
14th-century deaths
Yuan dynasty painters
Painters from Suzhou
14th-century Chinese painters
People from Kunshan